François Alexis Brun-Buisson (born 23 September 1863, date of death unknown) was a French fencer. He competed in the men's masters foil and the men's masters sabre events at the 1900 Summer Olympics.

References

External links
 

1863 births
Year of death missing
French male foil fencers
French male sabre fencers
Olympic fencers of France
Fencers at the 1900 Summer Olympics
Fencers from Paris
Place of death missing